A monster game is a game that is either very large, very complex, or both. One criterion sometimes adopted is the number of pieces; a game which puts greater than 1000 counters into play at once may be considered to be a monster game. This classification can technically be applied to any board game, but most commonly refers to the kind of non-abstract wargames in which a large amount of time is needed to play each turn as a result of a relatively high commitment to period accurate military realism. There is controversy over which would have been the first monster game in the field of wargames with many stating that Drang Nach Osten! (GDW, 1973) was pretty universally accepted as the first monster wargame. Drang Nach Osten and its companion, Unentschieden led to the Europa Series games, a giant WWII game.

Wargames that are considered monster games include:

See also
Europa (wargame)
War in Europe (game) 
List of board wargames
List of wargame publishers
Simulation game
Tactical wargame

References

External links
 Drang Nach Osten! (Boardgamegeek)
 SPI Monster Games